SGS Essen are a German multi-sports club based in Essen, North Rhine-Westphalia. The club was founded in 2000 from the merger of VfB Borbeck and SC Grün-Weiß Schönebeck. It is most renowned for its women's football team, which plays in the top-tier Frauen-Bundesliga.

History
On 21 March 1973 SC Grün-Weiß Schönebeck established its women's section. After playing for several years in lower leagues, Schönebeck was promoted to the Verbandsliga (III) in 1992. They played in this league until 1999 with an intermezzo in 1996–97, when the club participated for a year in the Regionalliga (II). The promotion to the Regionalliga in 1999 was followed by five years of football in that league until Schönebeck gained promotion to the Bundesliga in 2004.

In the 2002–03 season the club had struggled in the Regionalliga and the aim for the 2003–04 season was to qualify for the 2. Bundesliga, starting in the next season. They won their league though and after a successful qualification round gained promotion to the highest league in German women's football. Since Schönebeck has established itself in the Bundesliga, generally achieving mid-table results. The best result was a 4th place in 2018–19. The team has reached the German cup semi-finals in 2007 and 2010.

The club's biggest success came by reaching the women's cup finals of the 2013–14 DFB-Pokal and the 2019–20 DFB-Pokal.

Current squad

Former players

References

External links

Official website of the multi-sports club

 
Women's football clubs in Germany
Association football clubs established in 2000
Football clubs in North Rhine-Westphalia
2000 establishments in Germany
Sport in Essen
Frauen-Bundesliga clubs